

Eye-gouging is the act of pressing or tearing the eye using the fingers or instruments. Eye-gouging involves a very high risk of eye injury, such as eye loss or blindness. 

Eye-gouging as a fighting style was once a popular form of sport fighting in the back-country United States, primarily in the 18th and 19th centuries.

Eye-gouging is prohibited in modern sports. It is a serious offense in rugby football codes where it occurs rarely. It is prohibited in combat sports, but some self-defense systems teach it. Training in eye-gouging can involve extensive grappling training to establish control, the eye-gouging itself being practiced with the opponent wearing eye protection such as swimming goggles. Yuki Nakai went on to win a bout in the Vale Tudo Japan 1995 tournament after his opponent, Gerard Gordeau, performed an illegal gouge that blinded him in his right eye.

See also
Enucleation of the eye
Eye for an eye
Eye poke
List of rugby union players banned for eye gouging
Gouging (fighting style)
Phantom eye syndrome

References

Further reading
 United States Marine Corps (1999). USMC MCRP 3-02B Close Combat. Department of the Navy. .
 Zorbas, Vagelis. Kino Mutai: The Art of Biting and Eye Gouging. www.fullcombat.com. URL last accessed January 7, 2006.

External links
 Can the human eyeball be knocked out of the head?

Human eye
Grappling
Martial art techniques
Violence